The Dancer Upstairs is a 1995 novel by Nicholas Shakespeare. It is based on the Maoist insurgency of the 1980s in Peru, and tells the story of Agustin Rejas, a police Lieutenant (later promoted to Captain), hunting a terrorist based on Abimael Guzmán, leader of the Shining Path. In 2002 it was given a film adaptation under the same title.

References

1995 British novels
British crime novels
British historical novels
British novels adapted into films
Novels set in Lima
Novels set in the 1980s
Internal conflict in Peru
Harvill Secker books